Roger Bigod (c. 1245 – bf. 6 December 1306) was 5th Earl of Norfolk.

Origins
He was the son of Hugh Bigod (1211–1266), Justiciar, and succeeded his father's elder brother Roger Bigod, 4th Earl of Norfolk (1209–1270) as 5th Earl of Norfolk in 1270.

Career
Bigod is the hero of a famous altercation with King Edward I in 1297, which arose from the king's command that Bigod should serve against the King of France in Gascony, while Edward himself went to Flanders. Bigod asserted that by the feudal tenure of his lands he was only compelled to serve across the seas in the company of the king himself, whereupon Edward said, "By God, Earl, you shall either go or hang," to which Bigod replied, "By the same oath, O king, I will neither go nor hang."

Bigod gained his point, and after Edward had left for France, together with Humphrey de Bohun, 3rd Earl of Hereford, Bigod prevented the collection of an aid for the war and forced Edward to confirm the charters in this year of 1297 and again in 1301. The historian William Stubbs reckoned Bigod and Bohun as "but degenerate sons of mighty fathers; greater in their opportunities than in their patriotism."

Bigod had done good service for the King in the past. In August 1282, for instance, contemporary accounts record Bigod "going to Wales on the king's service." During his absence in Ireland, Bigod had sent letters nominating Reginald Lyvet and William Cadel to act as his attorneys in England for the year. Reginald Lyvet was probably the son of Gilbert de Lyvet, who was Lord Mayor of Dublin for several terms in the early thirteenth century, and was a partisan of William Marshal, 1st Earl of Pembroke. Some scholars have wondered how English barons like Bigod and the Clares kept such a tight hold on their Irish lands during a time when the English grip on Ireland was starting to weaken. Apparently part of the secret was the delegation of authority, as in this case by Bigod to his lieutenants Lyvet and Cadel.

Marriages
Bigod married firstly Aline Basset, widow of Hugh le Despencer, 1st Baron le Despencer (d. 1265), and daughter and heiress of Sir Philip Basset of Soham, Cambridgeshire, by his first wife Hawise de Lovaine, daughter of Sir Matthew de Lovaine, by whom he had no issue.

He married secondly Alice of Hainault, daughter of John II de Avenes, Count of Hainault, by Philippine, daughter of Henry, Count of Luxembourg and Roche, Marquis of Arlon, by whom he had no issue.

Death
Bigod died on 6 December 1306.

Succession
In 1302 the elderly and childless Bigod surrendered his earldom to the king and received it back entailed "to the heirs of his body". This had the effect of disinheriting his brother John. Thus, when Roger died without issue in December 1306, his title became extinct, and his estates escheated to the crown and were eventually bestowed on Thomas of Brotherton, 1st Earl of Norfolk.

Notes

References

 , reprinted from History, 50 (1965), 145–59
 
 
 
Attribution
 

1240s births
1306 deaths
Earls Marshal
5th Earl of Norfolk
Roger